Omolara Ogundipe-Leslie (27 December 1940 – 18 June 2019), also known as Molara Ogundipe, was a Nigerian poet, critic, editor, feminist and activist. Considered one of the foremost writers on African feminism, gender studies and literary theory, she was a social critic who came to be recognized as a viable authority on African women among black feminists and feminists in general. She contributed the piece "Not Spinning on the Axis of Maleness" to the 1984 anthology Sisterhood Is Global: The International Women's Movement Anthology, edited by Robin Morgan. She is most celebrated for coining the term STIWA or Social Transformation in Africa Including Women.

Life
Abiodun Omolara Ogundipe was born in Lagos, Nigeria, to a family of educators and clergy. She attended Queen's School, Ede, and went on to become the first woman to obtain a first-class BA Honours degree in English at University College Ibadan, then a college of the University of London. She later earned a doctorate in Narratology (the theory of narrative) from Leiden University, one of the oldest universities in Europe. She taught English Studies, Writing, Comparative Literature and Gender from the perspectives of cultural studies and development at universities in several continents, and was also a Professor of English and Comparative Literature at the University of Port Harcourt, Rivers State Nigeria. She rose to prominence early in her career in the midst of a male-dominated artistic field concerned about the problems afflicting African men and women.

Molara Ogundipe was described as being "at the forefront of the theoretical dynamism which is unfolding within African feminism. She has a powerful and deeply ingrained cultural understanding of the dynamics of gender relations in the pre-colonial and colonial Yoruba society as a pivot for theory", Over the years, she was a critic of the oppression of women and argued that African women are more oppressed in their status and roles as wives. In view of their multiple identities, in some of which identities they enjoy status, privilege, recognition and agency. She criticized the plight of African women as due to the impact of imposed colonial and neo-colonial structures that often place African males at the height of social stratification. Their plight is also due to the internalization of patriarchy by African women themselves. She, however, insisted on an understanding of the complexity of the statuses of African women in their pre-colonial and indigenous cultures for any useful discussion or study of African women.

Ogundipe was in the leadership of feminist activism and gender studies in Africa for decades. She was the Founder and Director of the Foundation for International Education and Mentoring, which is dedicated to teaching young women the doctrine and virtues of feminist theories and gender equality.

She lived and worked in West Africa, where she set up writing centres at universities, in addition to her work on literature, gender and film, in contribution to her commitment to inter-generational education and mentoring.

She died at the age of 78 at her home in Ijebu-Igbo, Ogun State, Nigeria, in June 2019.

She is survived by her two daughters: Dr. (Ts'gye Maryam) Rachel Titilayo Leslie, a scholar of religion in Africa who writes on the significance of African legacies for global culture, and Dr. Isis Imotara Leslie, PhD, a political theorist who has taught at several US universities. Her grandchildren are Askia Tristan Folajimi Leslie, who graduated in Computer Engineering and Coding from the University of California, Berkeley, and Joshua Tolu Victoriano, who was recently ordained a deacon in the Ethiopian Orthodox Tewahedo Church in Ethiopia.

Writing
Molara Ogundipe was in the leadership of feminist and gender studies in Africa since graduating in 1963 from the University of London. She wrote for numerous academic and general publications, and also published books of non-fiction as well as a collection of poetry. Her work is included in anthologies of women's writing: her piece "Not spinning on the axis of Maleness" is in the 1984 anthology Sisterhood Is Global: The International Women's Movement Anthology, edited by Robin Morgan, and poems by her are in the 1992 anthology Daughters of Africa, edited by Margaret Busby.

Criticism
As a Nigerian scholar, critic, educator and activist, Ogundipe is recognized as one of the foremost writers on African women and feminism. She argued for an African-centred feminism that she termed "Stiwanism" (Social Transformation in Africa Including Women) in her book Recreating Ourselves. A distinguished scholar and literary theorist, she published numerous works of poetry and literary criticism in addition to her works cited below.

Stiwanism is concerned with seven principles: "STIWA" 1) resists Western feminism 2) gives specific attention to African women in this contemporary moment 3) brings to the forefront indigenous feminism that has also existed in Africa 4) believes in both inclusion and participation in the socio-political transformation of the African continent 5) contends with a woman's body, personhood, nationhood, and society and how it operates within socio-economic hierarchies 6) is intentionally specific to the individual and collective identity (i.e. religion, class, and marital status) 7) recognizes that there are many factors and identities in Africa and individual personhoods operating in different and contradictory ways.

Ogundipe earlier in her career had posited that a true feminist writer had to understand or describe effectively a woman's viewpoint and how to tell the story about a woman. She strongly believed that rediscovering the role of women in Nigeria's social and political institutions may be the best way to improve those institutions. She was known as a writer whose works capture most vividly the complexities of African life. In Re-Creating Ourselves: African Women and Critical Transformations, she wrote brilliantly about the dilemma of writing in her traditional language and men's resistance to gender equality. Through the vast literary experiences and many gender-related writings, Ogundipe provided "intricate oeuvre" that enable African feminists to engage in bringing meaningful changes in issues related to gender, family and society that can drive national and continental development.

Books
 Sew the Old Days and Other Poems, 1985
 Re-Creating Ourselves: African Women & Critical Transformations, 1994
 (ed.) Women as Oral Artists, 1994
 (ed. with Carole Boyce-Davies) Moving Beyond Boundaries, April 1995 (two volumes).
 Gender and subjectivity. Readings of "Song of Lawino". Dissertation Leiden University. Leiden, CNWS, 1999

Notes

References
Gay Wilentz: "Review: Postcolonial / Postmodern: What's in a Wor(l)d?" College English, Vol. 56, No. 1 (January 1994).
Gibreel M. Kamara: "The Feminist Struggle in the Senegalese Novel: Mariama Ba and Sembene Ousmane". Journal of Black Studies, Vol. 32, No. 2, November 2001.
Allan, Tuzyline Jita: "Book reviews, Re-Creating Ourselves: African Women and Critical Transformations by Molara Ogundipe-Leslie". Research in African Literatures, Summer 1995.
Ogundipe (a.k.a. Ogundipe-Leslie), M. Indigenous and Contemporary Gender Concepts and Issues in Africa: Implications for Nigeria’s development. Lagos, Benin, Ibadan, Jos, Oxford, Zaria: Malthouse Limited P., 2005.

External links
 "Desiree Lewis talks to Molara Ogundipe, leading feminist theorist, poet, literary critic, educator and activist, about the interface of politics, culture and education".
 "Hooray for a Pioneer in African Literary Studies!", Journal of the African Literature Association, 5:2, 179–181, DOI: 10.1080/21674736.2010.11690165.
 "Molara Ogundipe-Leslie", Beyond the Single Story.

1940 births
2019 deaths
Alumni of the University of London
Writers from Lagos
Yoruba women writers
Leiden University alumni
Marxist writers
Nigerian feminists
Nigerian writers
Postcolonial theorists
University of Ibadan alumni
Nigerian women writers
20th-century Nigerian writers
Yoruba poets
English-language writers from Nigeria
20th-century women writers
Feminist writers
Nigerian women academics
Nigerian women activists